A bow maker is a person who builds, repairs, and restores ancient or modern bows for bowed string instruments. These include violins, violas, cellos, double basses, viola d'amore, viola da gamba, etc.

The French word for bowmaker (bow maker) is archetier  for one who makes bows of the string family of instruments such as violin, viola, cello and double bass.
Root of the word comes from archet—pronounced —the bow.

A bow maker typically uses between 150 and 200 hairs from the tail of a horse for a violin bow. Bows for other members of the violin family typically have a wider ribbon, using more hairs. White hair generally produces a smoother sound and black hair (used mainly for double bass bows) is coarser, producing a rougher sound. Lower quality (inexpensive) bows often use nylon or synthetic hair. Rosin, a hard, sticky substance made from resin (sometimes mixed with wax), is regularly applied to the bow hair to increase friction.
In making the stick of a bow, the initial part of the woodworking is done on a straight stick. According to James McKean, "the bow maker graduates the stick in precise gradations so that it is evenly flexible throughout." These gradations were calculated by François Tourte, discussed below.
In order to shape the curve or "camber" of the bow stick, the maker carefully heats the stick over a source of heat (such as an alcohol flame or a heat gun) a few inches at a time, bending the heated stick gradually to the proper shape. A metal or wooden template is often used to get the exact model's curve and shape while heating.

History 

Up until the standardization of the bow by François Tourte in 1785, most bows with rare exceptions remained anonymous (before 1750).
And although François Tourte attained an enormous measure of fame in his own lifetime, the tradition of the anonymous bow maker was still so strong that theorists like Woldemar and Fetis called Tourte's new-model bow not the Tourte bow but the Viotti  bow, after his contemporary the violinist.- David Boyden (After his father's death, Tourte, in collaboration with the violin virtuoso G. B. Viotti, made important changes in the form of the bow in the Classical period between 1785 and 1790. They lengthened them slightly, to 74 – 75 centimetres, and used more wood in the tip and a heavier nut.)

With the dawn of a new era in the introduction of the modern bow design by François Tourte, so too was the importance placed on the bow maker rather than the luthier to produce such playing tools.

Quotes 

"Giovanni Battista Viotti, the 18th- century violin virtuoso who is rumored to have consulted with Tourte on the bows formulation, to declare: Le violon, c’est l’archet - the violin, it is the bow. 
The bow is so crucial that much of the music of Beethoven, Brahms and Schubert and their musical heirs would not be performable without it...."

"The French bow maker François-Xavier Tourte, more commonly known as François Tourte or Tourte le jeune, is often referred to as "the inventor of the modern bow," or "the Stradivari of the bow." His bows, dating from the end of the eighteenth century and the early decades of the nineteenth, had a marked effect upon the timbre of violins and upon performance practice, enabling new forms of expression and articulation to be developed, and in particular, facilitating the increased use of legato. François Joseph Fétis's entry in the second, expanded edition of his Biographie universelle des musiciens et bibliographie générale de la musique (1860–65) has until recently been the only source of biographical information about François Tourte. Some thirty documents recently discovered in French archives provide further fresh insight into this maker's life and work."
Stewart Pollens,
Metropolitan Museum of Art, New York

"Tourte - French family of bowmakers and luthiers. It  Nicolas Pierre Tourte and his sons Nicolas Léonard and François Xavier and perhaps Charles Tourte, son of Nicolas Léonard. In addition, at least two channelled (canalé) bows dating from about 1750–60 exist bearing the brand-stamp A.TOURTE." - Paul Childs

Bibliography 
 François-Xavier Tourte - Bow Maker by Stewart Pollens and Henryk Kaston with M.E.D. Lang, 2001 (Tourte's background, his working life and bow-making techniques.)

See also 
Pernambuco
Saving the Music Tree
Playing the violin, section on "Bowing techniques"
Rosin
String instrument, section on "Bowing"
Musical bow, musical instrument

References 

McKean, James N. (1996) Commonsense Instrument Care. San Anselmo, California: String Letter Publishing.  
Saint-George, Henry. The Bow (London, 1896; 2: 1909).
Bow (music)
Saving the Music Tree
Saving the Music Tree
 
 
 
 
 Dictionnaire Universel del Luthiers - Rene Vannes 1951,1972, 1985 (vol.3)
 Universal Dictionary of Violin & Bow Makers - William Henley 1970

Bow makers 

 Jean Adam (bow maker)
 Jean Dominique Adam
 Ludwig Bausch
 Bazin Family
 François Xavier Bazin
 Arthur Bultitude
 John Dalley (bow maker, violinist Quarneri String Quartet)
 Fetique (bow makers)
 Jules Fetique
 Marcel Gaston Fetique
 Victor Fetique
 Joseph Fonclause
 Joseph Henry (bow maker)
 Nicolaus Kittel
 Heinrich Knopf
 Alfred Lamy
 Joseph Alfred Lamy
 Marcel Lapierre
 Giovanni Lucchi
 Nicolas Remy Maire
 Nicolas Maline
 Jean Joseph Martin
 Morizot Family
 Louis Morizot
 Jean-Jacques Millant
 Bernard Ouchard
 Emile Auguste Ouchard
 Emile Francois Ouchard
 Etienne Pajeot
 Charles Peccatte
 Dominique Peccatte
 François Peccatte
 Keith Peck
 Jean Pierre Marie Persois
 Andre Richaume
 Eugene Sartory
 Pierre Simon
 François Tourte
 James Tubbs
 Andre Vigneron
 Joseph Arthur Vigneron
 Vigneron (bow makers)
 François Nicolas Voirin
 Jean-Baptiste Vuillaume
 John Norwood Lee

External links

List of contemporary bow makers

Famous Violinist's Bows
 Yung Chin Master Bow Maker - Dealer of fine bows
 Book about bow making
 Article about horse hair.
 Commissioning a bow.
 Mastering New Materials: Commissioning an Amber Bow, no.65
 Production of a carbon fiber bow 
 eNotes article on the history and making of bows.

String instrument construction
Lutherie